Bauler may refer to:

People
Harry Bauler (1910–1962), American politician
John Bauler, alderman of the 22nd ward of Chicago (1912–1920), brother of Paddy Bauler
Paddy Bauler (1890–1977), corrupt Chicago politician

Places
Bauler, Ahrweiler
Bauler, Bitburg-Prüm